Franklin Island may refer to:

Franklin Island (Antarctica), an Antarctic island in the Ross Sea
Franklin Island (Greenland), an island of Greenland in the Nares Strait